Romeo   is a 1990 Dutch drama film directed by Rita Horst, starring Monique van de Ven and Johan Leysen. It was entered into the 17th Moscow International Film Festival.

Cast
Monique van de Ven	 ... 	Anne Herden
Johan Leysen	... 	Matthijs
Ottolien Boeschoten	... 	Nel
Peter Bolhuis	... 	Chiel
Hans Croiset... 	Dokter
Peter De Wijn	... 	Verhoeven, oude man
Coby Timp	... 	Moeder van Anne
Bob van den Berg	... 	Vader van Anne
Pim Lambeau	... 	Dame met hondje
Mouna Goeman Borgesius	... 	Verpleegster
Theo de Groot	... 	Co-assistant
Nettie Blanken	... 	Tweede dokter
Judy Doorman	... 	Kennis Matthijs
Elja Pelgrom	... 	Kennis Anne
Arjan Kindermans	... 	Frank

References

External links 
 

1990 films
1990 drama films
1990s Dutch-language films
Dutch drama films